This is a list of adult fiction books that topped The New York Times Fiction Best Seller list in 1996.

See also

 New York Times Nonfiction Best Sellers of 1996
 1996 in literature
 Lists of The New York Times Fiction Best Sellers
 Publishers Weekly list of bestselling novels in the United States in the 1990s

References

1996
.
1996 in the United States